Cəngan may refer to:
Cəngan, Jalilabad, Azerbaijan
Cəngan, Neftchala, Azerbaijan
Cəngan, Sabirabad, Azerbaijan
Cəngan, Salyan, Azerbaijan
Dzhangyan, Azerbaijan